The New Alliance for Democracy and Development in Burundi (NADDEBU) is a small political party in Burundi founded in 2002 by Jean-Paul Burafuta.

Political parties in Burundi